Dankowski (feminine: Dankowska) is a Polish-language surname derived from one of the locations named Danków or Dankowo. The placenames themselves literally mean "belonging to Danek".

Adela Dankowska, Polish aviator and politician
Bronisław Dankowski, Polish politician
Ed Danowski, American football player 
Józef Dankowski, Polish football coach and a former player
Joseph Dankowski, American fine art photographer
Kamil Dankowski, Polish professional footballer

Polish-language surnames
Polish toponymic surnames